Whiteiidae is an extinct family of prehistoric coelacanth fishes which lived during the Triassic period.

References

 
Triassic bony fish
Triassic first appearances
Triassic extinctions
Prehistoric lobe-finned fish families